Cinema of the Democratic Republic of the Congo (DRC) originated with educational and propaganda films during the colonial era of the Belgian Congo. Development of a local film industry after the Democratic Republic of the Congo became independent in 1960 was handicapped by constant civil war.

Colonial era

During the colonial era before the DRC gained independence as Zaire, administrators of the Belgian Congo did not allow Africans watch foreign films, officially because they said they could not understand the difference between fact and fiction. In reality, authorities feared that the films would cause subversive behavior. The government's Film and Photo Bureau did make films for the local population in the 1940s, with educational and/or propaganda themes. African workers were employed by the bureau and were taught the basic techniques of film production.

Two companies run by Catholic priests also employed Africans in making films about religious values: 
The Congolese Center for Catholic Action Cinema (CCCAC) in Léopoldville
Africa Films in Kivu.   
The CCCAC created a series of short films titled Les Palabres de Mboloko (Tales of Mboloko), starring an animated antelope. The government kept firm control over the format and content of the films produced by these two companies.

, founded in 1950 in Brussels by George Fannoy, made documentaries and news items in the DRC.

Post-independence

Following independence in 1960 the country experienced a series of civil wars that largely destroyed the nascent film industry. Foreign support has allowed some directors to create movies in the DRC, notably from the French ministry of foreign affairs. The DRC government has shown interest in assisting the development of a local film industry. Almost all DRC filmmakers live and work abroad.

Mwezé Ngangura is the best known Congolese director, making his first short film Tamtam électronique (Electronic Tamtam) in 1973 and the first Congolese feature movie, La Vie est Belle in 1987. His Identity Pieces, a musical comedy, won the Stallion de Yennenga at the Panafrican Film and Television Festival of Ouagadougou in 1999.

Raoul Peck, a Haitian who was brought up in Zaire, directed the documentary Lumumba. La mort d'un prophète (1991), about the life of Patrice Lumumba, who led the country into independence. Kibushi N'djate Wooto produced the animated short  in 1992, with French funding.

In 1994 Josef Kumbela made the short Perle noire (Black Pearl), which he followed with a series of other short films. Jose Laplaine's comic drama Macadam Tribu (Macadam Tribe) (1996) made fun of the constant quest for money, status and sex in Africa's urban neighborhoods. SKIFF, the first film festival in the DRC, brought together over 15,000 people in a span of ten days. The festival screens international and local cinema, and has an open-air concert and numerous dance competitions. In 2014 SKIFF celebrated its 10th anniversity. However, as recorded in Guy Bomanyama-Zandu's 2005 documentary Le Congo, quel cinéma!, local productions today have difficulty making money.
The film follows three Congolese technicians (Claude Mukendi, Pierre Mieko, and Paul Manvidia-Clarr) and Ferdinand Kanza, a director who made films in the 1970s and now works at the National Radio Television of Congo.
Another 2005 documentary by the same director, La Mémoire du Congo en péril (The Momory of Congo in Danger), describes the Congolese Film Library. The library owns thousands of films that form part of the history of Congolese cinema, some dating as far back as 1935. They are in extremely poor condition and in danger of being lost.

In 2009 the United Nations High Commissioner for Refugees was using the cinema to break taboos on discussing rape, which was commonplace during the civil wars. The documentary Breaking the Silence covers sexual violence and abuse of women, topics that most people are reluctant to discuss. It was made by IF Productions of the Netherlands and is being screened by a mobile cinema operated by Search for Common Ground (SFCG), a US-based NGO. Screenings are often open-air, with power provided by a generator. Nonetheless, in 2015 the DRC government, cancelled scheduled screenings of Thierry Michel's L'homme qui répare les femmes (The Man Who Repairs Women) about Dr Denis Mukwege, a Nobel nominee who treats survivors of rape, torture and mutilation in the violence against women that has been endemic to Congolese civil wars. Lambert Mende, the DRC communications minister, said the film made “unjustified attacks” on soldiers.

Filmmaker Balufu Bakupa-Kanyinda helped organize the first Semaine du film congolais (Sefico) festival in May 2011 at Le Zoo, a cultural center. In July 2001 Balufu Bakupa-Kanyinda announced at the Festival du cinéma africain in Khouribga, Morocco that he intended to acquire four cinemas in Kinshasa. He was looking for partners to help acquire the cinemas to serve Kinshasa, a city with ten million inhabitants but no cinemas at all.
The industry was given a sobriquet of CongoFilmz to help brand Congolese cinema and promote it further worldwide.

See also
List of Democratic Republic of the Congo films
Media of the Democratic Republic of the Congo
Cinema of Africa

References